The 2004–05 ISU World Standings, are the World Standings published by the International Skating Union (ISU) during the 2004–05 season.

The 2004–05 ISU World Standings for single & pair skating and ice dance, are taking into account results of the 2002–03, 2003–04 and 2004–05 seasons.

World Standings for single & pair skating and ice dance

Season-end standings 
The remainder of this section is a list, by discipline, published by the ISU.

Men's singles (30 skaters) 
As of March 17 2005

Ladies' singles (50 skaters) 
As of March 23 2005

Pairs (40 couples) 
As of March 23 2005

Ice dance (125 couples) 
As of March 18 2005

See also 
 ISU World Standings and Season's World Ranking
 List of highest ranked figure skaters by nation
 List of ISU World Standings and Season's World Ranking statistics
 2004–05 figure skating season

References

External links 
 International Skating Union

ISU World Standings and Season's World Ranking
Standings and Ranking
Standings and Ranking